Giovanni Fontana (born 1946) is an Italian poet, performance artist, author and publisher.

Career
Fontana was born in Frosinone, Lazio. He has been dealing for forty years with multi-code languages, intermedia techniques, sound poetry and visual poetry.

Interested in the relationship between the arts, he came to a new conception of text and theorized the concepts of "pre-textual poetry" and the "epigenetic poetry". His visual compositions present themselves as real scores, as pre-texts through which to attain a performance dimension.
From the latter half of the 1960s he has experience of theatre with the dramatic art groups. In 1968 he founded a small experimental theatre company. For theatre he wrote texts and he also worked as scenographer and musician.
His first visual poems are dated around the years of 1966–1968 and they develop parallel to sound experimentations on magnetic tape, which later were used in theatre (1968–1972).

Fontana has published books and records. Among his works are the score-text Radio/Dramma (1977), the visual poetry works Le lamie del labirinto (1981) and L'uomo delle pulizie (1984), the collection of poetry Scritture lineari (1986), the poems La discarica fluente (1997), Frammenti d'ombre e penombre (2005), Questioni di scarti (2012), the monograph Testi e pre-testi (2010) and two novels: Tarocco Meccanico (1990) and Chorus (2000).
Fontana wrote theoretical and critical essays, including "La voce in movimento" (2003), "Poesia della voce e del gesto" (2004), "Le dinamiche nomadi della performance" (2006), "L'opera plurale" (2009).

Fontana was the curator of the CD Verbivocovisual. Antologia di poesia sonora 1964–2004 for the magazine Il Verri; he  founded La Taverna di Auerbach, an international magazine of intermedial poetics, and the magazine of sound poetry Momo (voci, suoni & rumori della poesia), and he is an editor of  the audiomagazine Baobab.  With his visual poems he took part in many exhibitions in Europe, in the Americas, in Japan and Australia, giving performances and installations in thousands of festivals for new poetry and electronic art.

Bibliography

Radio/Dramma, Geiger, Torino, Italy, 1977;
Le lamie del labirinto, Dismisuratesti, Frosinone, Italy, 1981;
L'uomo delle pulizie, Dismisuratesti, Frosinone, Italy, 1984;
Scritture lineari, Hetea, Alatri, Italy, 1986;
Tarocco Meccanico, Altri Termini, Napoli, Italy, 1990;
Homaly Altrove, Pensionante de' Saraceni, Caprarica di Lecce, Italy, 1990;
Chorus. Romanzo per voci a battuta libera, Piero Manni Editore, Lecce, Italy, 2000 [; 9788881761715];
Paysages, ovvero La favola breve dei sensi confusi, Archivio Poiesis, Alatri, Italy, 2000;
"Art Action in Italy", in Art Action, 1958-1998, Inter/éditeur, Québec, Québec, 2001[; 9782920500198];
La voce in movimento. Vocalità, scritture e strutture intermediali nella sperimentazione poetico-sonora, Ed. Harta Performing & Momo, Monza, Italy, 2003 [; 9788888421018];
Poesia della voce e del gesto, Editoriale Sometti, Mantova, Italy, 2004 ;
"Arte Acción en Italia", in Arte Acción, IVAM, Institut Valencà d'Art Modern, Valencia, Spain, 2004 [; 9788448237141];
Frammenti d'ombre e penombre, Fermenti, Roma, Italy, 2005 ;
Le dinamiche nomadi della performance, Edizioni Harta Performing, Monza, Italy, 2006;
L'opera plurale: intermedialità, drammaturgia delle arti, poesia d'azione, Edizioni Harta Performing, Monza, Italy, 2009;
Testi e pre-testi, Fondazione Berardelli, Brescia, Italy, 2009;
Wasted time, Redfoxpress, Achill Island, Ireland, 2011;
Giovanni Fontana digerisce l'anima, Marcantoni Arte Contemporanea, Pedaso, Italy, 2012;
Le arti del suono - Poetiche fonetiche ed altre, Aracne Editrice S.r.l., Roma, Italy, 2012, ;
Questioni di scarti, Edizioni Polìmata, Roma, Italy, 2012, ;
Déchets, Dernier Télégramme, Limoges, France, 2014, ;
Italian Performance Art (with Nicola Frangione and Roberto Rossini), Sagep Editori, Genova, Italy, 2015, ;
Penultime battute, Eureka Edizioni, Corato (Bari), Italy, 2017;
Fonemi (Memorie d'Artista, Artist book n. 43), Ed. Galleria Peccolo, Livorno, Italy, 2017;
In fluenti traslati. L'opera poetica di Arrigo Lora Totino, Fondazione Berardelli, Brescia, Italy, 2018;
Discrasie - Sessioni metacritiche, Collana Entroterra, Edizioni Novecento Libri, Roma, Italy, 2018, ;
La voix et l'absence, Dernier Télégramme, Limoges, France, 2019, ;
No A <–> No Z, with Klaus Peter Dencker, Achill Island, Ireland, 2019; 
Epigenetic Poetry (edited by Patrizio Peterlini), Danilo Montanari Editore, Ravenna, Italy, 2020, ;
Il corpo denso, preface by Barbara Meazzi, Campanotto Editore, Pasian di Prato (Udine), Italy, 2021, ;
Paysages, ovvero La favola breve dei sensi confusi, preface by Eugenio Miccini, new edition, Fondazione Bonotto, Colceresa (Vicenza), Italy, 2021.
HIC, edited by Giorgio Moio, Città di Castello (PG), Bertoni Editore, 2021, ISBN 9788855354141.
Je sens [donc je son, preface by Barbara Meazzi, Marseille - Limoges, Cipm & Dernier Télégramme, 2021, ISBN 979-10-97146-41-2.
Inventario, preface by Salvatore Luperto, Edizioni Milella, Lecce, 2022, ISBN 978-88-3329-013-3.
The Poetic Machine, Redfoxpress, Achill Island, Ireland, 2022.

Discography

Oggi Poesia Domani, audio tape "Baobab" 3, Reggio Emilia, Italy, 1979;
Il Dolce Stil Suono, audio tape "Baobab" 4, Reggio Emilia, Italy, 1980);
Sep-tic, audio tape "Vec" 7, Maastricht, Holland, 1980;
Ulise's Dog, audio tape "Vec" 9, Maastricht, Holland, 1981;
Hark, audio tape "Vec" 14, Maastricht, Holland, 1982;
Voooxing Poooêtre, vinyl record LP 33 rpm, Comune di Bondeno, Bondeno, Italy, 1982; 
The Voice, audio tape "Area Condizionata" 2, Forte dei Marmi, Italy, 1983;
Mail Music, vinyl record LP 33 rpm, Ed. Armadio Officina, Monza, Italy, 1983;
Nuovi Segnali, audio tape, Ed. Maggioli, Rimini, Italy, 1983;
Poema Larsen, vinyl record 45 rpm, Ed. 3Vi Tre, Cento, Italy, 1983;
Audio Child, audio tape, Ed. Gajewski, Amsterdam, Holland, 1984; 
Tracksound, audio tape, Ed. Tracce, Pescara, Italy, 1984;
To post a tape, audio tape, Ed. Minimart, Cesson, France, 1984; 
Italics Environments, vinyl record LP 33 rpm, Ed. Armadio Officina, Monza, Italy, 1985;
Polipoesia, vinyl record 45 rpm, Ed. 3Vi Tre, Cento, Italy, 1985;
Antologia Polipoetica, audio tape, STI Ed., Zaragoza, Spain, 1986;
Inter K-7 '87, audio tape, Ed. Le Lieu, Québec, Canada, 1987;
Spagna-Messico-Italia, vinyl record LP 33 rpm, Ed. 3Vi Tre Pair, Cento, Italy, 1988;
Past & Modern Sound Poetry in Italy, audio tape, "Slowscan" 8, Hertogenbosch, Netherlands, 1988;
FIRA 89, audio tape edited by José Iges, RNE, Madrid, Spain, 1989;
Storia della Poesia Sonora, audio tape "Baobab" 18, Reggio Emilia, Italy, 1989;
Baobab Festival, audio tape "Baobab" 19, Reggio Emilia, Italy, 1990;
FIRA 90, audio tape edited by José Iges, RNE, Madrid, Spain, 1990;
Baobab Italia 1990/91, audio tape "Baobab" 21, Reggio Emilia, Italy, 1992;
Building Plans & Schemes  - Radio Art & Telephone Networking, audio tape, Radio Omroep, Limburg, Holland, 1993;
L'in-canto del verso, 4 audio tapes edited by Giovanni Fontana and Luca Salvadori, "Baobab" 23, Reggio Emilia, Italy, 1994;
Italia 1995, 4 audio tapes, "Baobab" 27, Reggio Emilia, Italy, 1995;
Momo 1, audio tape Momo, Ed. Rouge et Noir, Frosinone, Italy, 1996;
"Prospettiva 4", in Wirrwarr by Umberto Petrin, CD, Splasc(h) Records, Varese, Italy, 1996;
Radio Art, CD, Ed. Harta Performing, Monza, Italy, 1997;
Opérette d'artistes, CD, Fractal Music, Production Station Mir, Hérouville St. Claire, France, 1998;
Elettrocabaret - Riletture futuriste di Giovanni Fontana, CD + artist booklet, Edizioni Farsettiarte, Prato, Italy, 1999;
Il gioco delle voci, CD enclosed to the book Chorus, Ed. Piero Manni, Lecce, Italy, 2000;
Homo Sonorus, An international anthology of sound poetry, 4 CD + book, The National Center of Contemporary Art, Kaliningrad Branch, Russia, 2001;
La voce in movimento, "Momo" 2, CD + book edited by Giovanni Fontana, Ed. Rouge et Noir, Frosinone, Italy, 2003;
Verbivocovisual – Antologia di poesia sonora 1964-2004, edited by Giovanni Fontana, CD enclosed to the magazine Il Verri, n° 25, Ed. Monogramma, Milano, Italy, 2004;
Erratum #4. Sound review. Noise + Art + Poetry, 3 CD, Edited by Erratum Musical, Besançon, France, 2004;
Krikri 2006, CD, Ed. Krikri, Gand, Belgium, 2006;
Il mondo è stato riconsiderato. Poesie italiane del secondo Novecento, CD edited by Endre Szhàrosi, Bölcsész Konzorcium HEFOP Iroda, Budapest, Hungary, 2006;
Per le segrete stanze, CD enclosed to the catalogue "Wunderkammern", Ed. Artpages, Isernia-Napoli, Italy, 2007;
Stanza segreta, CDrom, "Le son d'amour – Leçon d'amour", Doc(k)s 5/8, Akenaton production, Ajaccio, France, 2008;
Ex macchina ricordi, CD edited by Pierre-André Arcand, Avatar – Ohm, Québec, Canada, 2008;
Piedigrottesco 2009, "Futurismo – 100 anni", Stagione dei concerti del Conservatorio di Frosinone, Ed. speciale del Conservatorio, Frosinone, Italy, 2009 [Giovanni Fontana, voice; Luca Salvadori, prepared piano];
Sento [dunque suono, DVD enclosed to the magazine "In pensiero", n° 02, gennaio/giugno, 2009, Ed. Michelangelo libri, Roma, Italy, 2009;
Hypervox, antologia sonora 1968-2009, personal anthology, CD enclosed to the book Testi e pre-testi, Ed. Fondazione Berardelli, Brescia, Italy, 2009;
Épidémie, DVD enclosed to the magazine Doc(k)s, 4ème Série, n° 13/14/15/16, Edition Akenaton, Ajaccio, France, 2011;
Corpo a corpo, personal anthology, CD enclosed to the magazine The New Lotta Poetica, n° 1/2012, Fondazione Sarenco e Parise Editore, Cunettone ai Colli, Italy, 2012;
Di bocca in bocca, DVD enclosed to the magazine Doc(k)s, 4ème série, n° 17/18/19/20, Edition Akenaton, Ajaccio, France, 2013;
Huellkurven 2, online sound poetry magazine, Wien 2014 ;
Epigenetic Poetry, LP 33 rpm, Ed. Recital, Los Angeles, U.S. 2016;
Cellar Vol. 2, CD, produced by Sean McCann, Ed. Recital, Los Angeles, U.S., 2017.

Videography

Conoscenza sottile/sottile inganno 1, by Giovanni Fontana, Video 2000, prod. Poiesis, Alatri, Italy, 1984;
Conoscenza sottile/sottile inganno 2, by Giovanni Fontana, Video 2000, prod. Poiesis, Alatri, Italy, 1985;
Improvvisa improvvisazione, by Giovanni Fontana, Video 2000, prod. Poiesis, Alatri, Italy, 1985;
Conoscenza sottile/sottile inganno 3, by Giovanni Fontana, Video 2000, prod. Poiesis, Alatri, Italy, 1987;
Espèces Nomades, edited by Françoise Dugré and Richard Martel, Prod. Le Lieu, Québec, Canada, 1987;
Le Voci della Scrittura, by Antonello Capurso and Giorgio Weiss, Prod. RAI, Dipartimento Scuola Educazione, Roma, Italy,1988;
Videor 1, by Orazio Converso, Prod. La Camera Blue, Roma, Italy, 1988;
Videor 2, by Orazio Converso, Prod. La Camera Blue, Roma, Italy, 1989;
Videor 3, by Orazio Converso, Prod. La Camera Blue, Roma, Italy, 1989;
Interzone, by Richard Martel and Nathalie Perrault, Prod. Les Editions Intervention, Québec, Canada, 1992;
Artist report, by Seiji Shimoda, Prod. Shimoda, Nagano, Japan, 1994;
Perforium, by Gyorgy Galantai, Prod. Artpool, Budapest, Hungary, 1995;
NIPAF 95, by Seiji Shimoda, Prod. Nipaf E.C., Nagano, Japan, 1995;
Tot Brossa, by Sarenco, Archivio del cinema e del video d'artista, Verona, Italia, 1997/98;
Harta performing 4-30 / 1-98, Commonpress of Italian Performing Arts, edited by Nicola Frangione, Ed. Harta Performing, Monza, Italy, 1998;
Poesia Totale, an exhibition curated by Enrico Mascelloni and Sarenco, videocatalogue by Piero Matarrese and Pierpaolo Murru, Digital Videoart Verona, Verona, Italy, 1998;
Apple Poem, by Giovanni Fontana, prod. Poiesis, VHS, Alatri, Italy, 1998;
Parole in libertà continuing, Paula Claire presenting work by Gino Severini, Carlo Belloli, Giovanni Fontana, Mirella Bentivoglio, Alberto Faietti, Paula Claire at the Estorick Collection of Italian Art, London, Ed. Int. Sound & Visual Poetry Archive, Oxford, 1999;
Viatge a la Polinèsia, "Volume XXIV: Poesia a la vista: videopoesia", videoperformance, Propost, Centre de Cultura Contemporània de Barcelona, Barcelona, Spain, 1999;
Poésie en action, DVD-Rom, edited by Philippe Castellin and Jean Torregrosa, Doc(k)s, n° 29/33 (CD enclosed), Ed. Akenaton, Ajaccio, France, 2003;
Varianti. Suono, parola, immagine, DVD by Leonardo Vecchi, editing Rodolfo Canaletti, Teatro San Matteo, Piacenza, Italy, 2004;
Chorus, by N. Ricciardulli and G. Kristensen, Itinerari Armonici / Angelus Novus, L'Aquila, Italy, 2004;
John Giorno. Voices in your head, by Antonio Poce, DVD, Centro Hermes, Ferentino, Italy, 2004;
Nuvolari, text and voice by Giovanni Fontana, music by Valerio Murat, video by Antonio Poce, DVD, prod. "Hermes Intermedia", Ferentino, Italy, 2005;
Coppi, voice by Giovanni Fontana and others, music by Valerio Murat, video and text by Antonio Poce, DVD, prod. "Hermes Intermedia", Ferentino, Italy, 2006;
5th International Krikri Festival of Polypoetry, DVD 4/5, TVF, ArtvideoTV, Gent, Belgium, 2006;
Visez au coeur, voice by Giovanni Fontana and others, music by Valerio Murat, video by Antonio Poce, DVD, prod. "Hermes Intermedia", Ferentino, Italy, 2006;
Sirene e incanti, text and voice by Giovanni Fontana, music and video by Antonio Poce, DVD, prod. "Hermes Intermedia", Ferentino, Italy, 2006;
Fluxus & Happening Friends, camera by Jean-François Boudreault, Georges Sheedy, Odile Tremblay; editing Paul Brunet; DVD PAL, prod. Le Lieu, Centre en Art Actuel, Québec, Canada, 2007;
Diavolo/Figura, voice by Giovanni Fontana, text by Elmerindo Fiore, music by Giampiero Gemini, video Antonio Poce, DVD, prod. "Hermes Intermedia", Ferentino, Italy, 2008;
Venti e zero cinque, DVD, text and voice by Giovanni Fontana; music and video Antonio Poce; sound editing Valerio Murat; prod. "Hermes Intermedia", Ferentino, Italy, 2009;
iCaroballa, DVD, text by Nanni Balestrini; voices Nanni Balestrini and Giovanni Fontana; music Luca Salvadori; directed by Giovanni Fontana; prod. "Hermes Intermedia", Ferentino, Italy, 2009;
Pneumastolfo, DVD, text and voice by Giovanni Fontana; music and video Antonio Poce; sound editing Valerio Murat; prod. "Hermes Intermedia", Ferentino, Italy, 2009;
Trentunesimo sparo, DVD, testo poetico e voce di Giovanni Fontana, musica di Alessandro Cipriani, video di Giulio Latini, 2009;
I prati del paradiso, poems by Aldo Palazzeschi, music by Giancarlo Cardini; voice by Giovanni Fontana, DVD, Studio audio-digitale Daniele Palermini, Frosinone, Italy, 2009;
Creazione Improvvisa, DVD edited by Dipartimento di Musica Jazz del Conservatorio di Frosinone, Frosinone 2009;
La caravane de la parole, by Jean-François Dugas, DVD NTSC, Prod. Le Lieu, Centre en art actuel, Québec, Canada, 2009 [2 DVD];
Fotodina(ni)mismo, DVD prod. "Hermes Intermedia" [text and voice by Giovanni Fontana; music by Ennio Morricone; video Antonio Poce; sound editing Valerio Murat], 2009;
Poema Bonotto, video poem by Giovanni Fontana, box with USB and printed sheets, critical text by Marco Maria Gazzano, edited by Patrizio Peterlini, Fondazione Bonotto, Molvena, Italy, 2017.

Further reading
Jean-François Bory, "Textes et pré-textes", in CCP, Cahier critique de poésie, Centre International de Poésie Marseille, n° 20, Marseille, France, 2010;
Gio Ferri, La ragione poetica. Scrittura e nuove scienze, Mursia, Milano 1994;
Pierre Garnier, "La voce e l'assenza", in Art in Italy, n° 11, Colognola ai Colli (Verona), Italy, 1998;
Bernard Heidsieck, "Giovanni Fontana et son combat", in Il suono e le parole. Otto artisti europei sonori visuali, edited by A. Malinconico, Marcus Edizioni, Napoli, Italy, 2006;
Eugenio Miccini, "Une sémiologie de la transgression", in Poésies sonores (edited by Vincent Barras and Nicholas Zurbrugg), Edition Contrechamps, Genêve, Swiss, 1992;
Francesco Muzzioli, "Scritture per voce e scritture in vista", in il Verri, n° 34, maggio, Milano, Italy, 2007;
Giulia Niccolai, "For Gianni Fontana's Radio Drama', in Harry's Bar e altre poesie, Feltrinelli, Milano, Italy, 1981;
Lamberto Pignotti, "La voce in movimento e altre voci", in Zeta, anno XXVI, n° 2, Paisan di Prato (Udine), Italy, settembre 2004;
Adriano Spatola, "Giovanni Fontana [Quadriennale di Roma]", in Flash Art, n° 134, Milano, Italy, 1986;
Paul Zumthor, Écriture et nomadisme, Éditions de l'Hexagone, Montréal, Canada, 1990;
Paul Zumthor, "Une poésie de l'espace", in Poésies sonores (edited by Vincent Barras and Nicholas Zurbrugg), Edition Contrechamps, Genêve, Swiss, 1992.

References

Italian poets
Italian male poets
People from Frosinone
1946 births
Living people
Visual poets